The Other Side is a 1931 German war film directed by Heinz Paul and starring Conrad Veidt, Theodor Loos and Friedrich Ettel.  It is an adaptation of R.C. Sherriff's 1928 First World War play Journey's End which had been turned into a British-American film the previous year. Paul's film attempted to be faithful to the play, retaining the British setting rather than switching the story to feature German soldiers and going to great lengths to portray the "Britishness" of the characters. The film was positively received on its release.

It was shot at the Johannisthal Studios in Berlin. The film's sets were designed by the art director Robert A. Dietrich.

Cast
 Conrad Veidt as Hauptmann Stanhope
 Theodor Loos as Oberleutnant Osborne
 Friedrich Ettel as Leutnant Trotter
 Viktor de Kowa as Leutnant Hibbert
 Wolfgang Liebeneiner as Leutnant Raleigh
 Paul Otto as Oberst
 William Trenk as Koch
 Reinhold Bernt as Feldwebel
 John Mylong as Hauptmann Hardy

References

Bibliography

External links

1931 films
1931 war films
German war films
Films of the Weimar Republic
1930s German-language films
Films directed by Heinz Paul
Western Front (World War I) films
German films based on plays
Remakes of American films
Remakes of British films
Films shot at Johannisthal Studios
German black-and-white films
1930s German films